Thiemo de Bakker was the defending champion but chose not to defend his title.

Sam Groth won the title after defeating Santiago Giraldo 6–7(4–7), 6–4, 7–5 in the final.

Seeds

Draw

Finals

Top half

Bottom half

References

External links
Main draw
Qualifying draw

Las Vegas Challenger - Singles
Las Vegas Challenger